"Stay" is a song by South Korean girl group Blackpink, released by YG Entertainment on November 1, 2016, together with "Playing with Fire", as a digital single titled Square Two. The song peaked at number 10 on the Gaon Digital Chart.

Background and release
On October 27, 2016, teaser images of all four members of Blackpink were released for the second title track "Stay" of their single Square Two. On October 30, YG Entertainment released the behind-the-scenes video of the music video for "Stay". The song and its music video were released on November 1 alongside "Playing with Fire".

Live performances
Blackpink performed their comeback stage for "Stay" and "Playing with Fire" on November 6 on SBS's Inkigayo, and on Mnet's M Countdown on November 10, 2016.

On October 23, 2021, Blackpink performed "Stay" as part of the YouTube Originals special Dear Earth, in which they delivered a speech about the importance of dealing with climate change.

Music video
The music video for "Stay" was directed by Han Sa Min, who previously directed "Gotta Be You" by 2NE1 and "Sober" by Big Bang. It was released on Blackpink's official YouTube channel at midnight on November 1, 2016 KST. In 2021, it surpassed 300 million views, becoming Blackpink's 16th video to reach this milestone.

Charts

Weekly charts

Monthly charts

References 

Blackpink songs
2016 singles
YG Entertainment singles
2016 songs
Songs written by Teddy Park